Romance of Radium is a 1937 American short film directed by Jacques Tourneur, and released by Metro-Goldwyn-Mayer. In 1937, it was nominated for an Academy Award for Best Short Subject (One-Reel) at the 10th Academy Awards.

Cast
 André Cheron as Henri Becquerel (uncredited)
 Eddie Hart as Photographer (uncredited)
 Pete Smith as Narrator (voice) (uncredited)
 Emmett Vogan as Pierre Curie (uncredited)

References

External links
 
 
 

1937 films
1937 documentary films
1937 short films
1930s short documentary films
1930s English-language films
American black-and-white films
Films produced by Pete Smith (film producer)
Films directed by Jacques Tourneur
American documentary films
1930s American films